The 7th Annual Nickelodeon Kids' Choice Awards was held on May 7, 1994, at the Pantages Theater in Los Angeles, California. The awards show was hosted by Joey Lawrence and Candace Cameron, with Marc Weiner hosting the east coast portion of the show from Universal Studios Florida. This ceremony was the first KCA broadcast since the 1992 show as Nickelodeon did not produce any KCA show in 1993.

Performers

The cast of Roundhouse performed during the opening of the show.

Winners and nominees
Winners are listed first, in bold. Other nominees are in alphabetical order.

Movies

Television

Music

Sports

Miscellaneous

Nick U.K.'s Favorite New Performer
 Let Loose

Special Recognition

Hall of Fame
 Michael Jordan
 Janet Jackson
 Whoopi Goldberg

References

External links
 

Nickelodeon Kids' Choice Awards
Kids' Choice Awards
Kids' Choice Awards
Kids' Choice Awards
1994 in Los Angeles